Hemidactylus aquilonius is a species of gecko. It is found in India and southeast Asia.

References

Hemidactylus
Reptiles described in 2007